Abraham Spinks (1799 — 1884) was an English first-class cricketer.

Spinks was born at the Norfolk village of Wretton in 1799. A member of the Norwich and Norfolk Club, he played first-class cricket for Norfolk on four occasions between 1833 and 1836, all against Yorkshire. He scored 72 runs in his four matches, with a respectable batting average for the time of 12; his highest score was 32, made at Sheffield in 1834, in an innings in which Fuller Pilch scored an unbeaten 153. As a bowler he was less effective, taking two wickets at a bowling average of 51. Spinks died in Norfolk in 1884.

References

External links

1799 births
1884 deaths
People from King's Lynn and West Norfolk (district)
English cricketers
Norfolk cricketers